Myripristis formosa is a species of soldierfish belonging to the genus Myripristis. It is endemic to Taiwan in the North-west Pacific Ocean. It is named after the Republic of Formosa, a short-lived republic that existed on Taiwan. It is demersal with a depth range of 15m to 30m.

References

formosa
Fish of the Pacific Ocean
Taxa named by John Ernest Randall
Taxa named by David Wayne Greenfield